Rosario Kennedy (born Rosario Arguelles y Freyre de Andrade in Cuba) is an American politician was the first Cuban American woman on the City of Miami Commission, former Vice Mayor of the City of Miami and candidate for Florida's 18th congressional district in the 1989 special election to replace Claude Pepper that was eventually won by Ileana Ros-Lehtinen.

Biography 
Rosario Kennedy is the granddaughter of Elicio Arguelles Pozo, President of the Senate, and the daughter of Elicio Arguelles Menocal, the last elected senator of Cuba before Castro's revolution, and Micaela Freyre de Andrade y Valdes Pita. Her great uncle, Mario Garcia Menobal, was President of Cuba, and she counts three uncles and cousins as former Mayors of Havana.

In 1960, Rosario Kennedy left Cuba with her family to escape the Communist incursion into Cuba led by Fidel Castro. She arrived in Miami and through a scholarship, attended the Convent of the Sacred Heart in Greenwich, Connecticut. Subsequently, she married Gustavo Godoy Andrews, who would become news director at WLTV-Channel 23 in Miami.  They had three children, Gustavo, Maria del Rosario, and Michelle Godoy-Arguelles. By the time she was 25, Kennedy was divorced.  She then became a real estate agent, ultimately  being named in 1979 "Florida Business Woman of the Year" by the international business magazine Mundo Latino.

In 1978, Kennedy married former City of Miami Mayor David T. Kennedy and divorced in 1987.

In 1985, Governor Bob Graham appointed her to the Hospital Cost Containment Board, which has regulatory authority over hospitals' budgets, and was elected chairperson by her peers. She founded the South Florida Women's Chamber of Commerce and chaired the Little Havana Activities Center. She created "United Against Crime", an organization that purchased non-budgeted items for the Police Department. She then ran for the City of Miami Commission against the incumbent, Demetrio Perez. She won that election and was later elected by her peers on the commission as Vice Mayor.  In 1989, after the death of Claude Pepper, Kennedy resigned her commission seat to run for the Florida's 18th Congressional seat.  She lost in the Democratic primary to Gerald Richman, who would eventually lose to Ileana Ros-Lehtinen.

References
 The Miami Herald; Kennedy Saga: Old (and New) Wives' Tale; July 3, 1989
 The Miami Herald; Kennedy to Assist Ex-Wife; March 20, 1989
 The Miami Herald; Miami Mayor Vote Won't Be In Back Room; June 12, 1996

1945 births
Living people
Florida city council members
Florida Democrats
Schools of the Sacred Heart alumni
Women state legislators in Florida
Women city councillors in Florida
American politicians of Cuban descent
Politicians from Miami
Hispanic and Latino American city council members
Hispanic and Latino American women in politics
Cuban-American culture in Miami
21st-century American women